The U.S. Post Office–Federal Building (also known as the Social Security Building) is a historic site in Sarasota, Florida. It is located at 111 South Orange Avenue. On March 22, 1984, it was added to the U.S. National Register of Historic Places.

See also 
List of United States post offices

References and external links 

 Florida's Office of Cultural and Historical Programs
 Sarasota County listings
 U.S. Post Office - Federal Building

National Register of Historic Places in Sarasota County, Florida
Buildings and structures in Sarasota, Florida
Post office buildings in Florida
Federal buildings in the United States
Government buildings completed in 1934
1934 establishments in Florida
Post office buildings on the National Register of Historic Places in Florida